Juraj Jakubisko (30 April 1938 – 24 February 2023) was a Slovak film director. He directed fifteen feature films, between 1967 and 2008. He often took on the dual role of cinematographer, and is often also credited as a screenplay writer as he usually co-writes or writes the scripts of his movies. In 2000 he was named Best Slovak Director of the 20th century by film critics and journalists. His work is often described as magical realism.

Career
Before entering the film industry, Jakubisko taught still photography at a secondary school for applied arts in Bratislava, and worked for a television company in Košice. In 1960 he moved to Prague where he attended the Film and TV School of the Academy of Performing Arts (FAMU), studying film direction under Václav Wasserman. He graduated in 1965 and began working with Alfréd Radok at the Laterna Magika theatre in Prague. He began winning international acclaim with his experimental short films before making his first feature Crucial Years in 1967. This film won a FIPRESCI award and a Josef von Sternberg Award in Mannheim, Germany. His next film, Deserters and Pilgrims, won the Little Lion award for young artists at the Venice Film Festival.

Jakubisko's career was heavily impacted by political events in Czechoslovakia, with his work facing censorship in the period following the Soviet-led Warsaw Pact invasion in response to the Prague Spring. During the "normalization" period which followed, he made a few documentaries, but no major feature films. He filmed Three Sacks of Cement and a Live Rooster in 1976, but it was not released until 1978.

Jakubisko returned to feature film-making in 1979 with Build a House, Plant a Tree, which was nonetheless banned for its anti-regime messages, but not before it received a positive reception at a film festival in Amsterdam. The success in Amsterdam proved invigorating for Jakubisko's work, leading to a fertile period, culminating in the 1983 epic The Millennial Bee. This movie was a huge success, selling out cinemas for many weeks after its release and winning awards at film festivals in Seville and Venice. The film was later named the best film of the 1980s by Czechoslovakian journalists.

In 1985, Jakubisko directed a children's film, The Feather Fairy, featuring Giulietta Masina, the wife of Federico Fellini, with whom Jakubisko also had a close friendship. His film Sitting on a Branch, Enjoying Myself, released three months before the end of the communist regime in Czechoslovakia, won Jakubisko more international acclaim, including the Grand Prize at the Moscow International Film Festival in 1990. 1990 also saw the belated release of Jakubisko's surrealist political horror, See You In Hell, My Friends, which had been banned 20 years earlier by communist censors.

Jakubisko and his wife relocated to Prague following the dissolution of Czechoslovakia in 1993, and set up a production company, Jakubisko films. Jakubisko's next feature film was An ambiguous report about the end of the world (1997), a satirical comedy based on the prophecies of Nostradamus. The film won four Czech Lion awards. In 1998 Jakubisko joined the European Film Academy, and was also awarded the Maverick Award by the Taos Talking Pictures Film Festival. In 2000 he was named Best Slovak Director of the 20th century by film writers, and won the Golden Seal in Belgrade for his contribution to world cinema.

In June 2001 he was appointed a lecturer at FAMU, his alma mater, and was awarded a lifetime achievement award by the Masaryk Academy of Art in Prague. In 2002 he received a Czech Lion for artistic achievement and received the Pribina Cross from the Slovak government, a special award given to those who have aided in the economic, social or cultural development of Slovakia. His next feature was Post Coitum (2004), a comedy about love starring Franco Nero.

Bathory
2008 saw the release of Bathory, starring Anna Friel as Elizabeth Báthory, a 16th-17th century Hungarian countess, often claimed to be one of history's most prolific mass murderers. She was reputed to have bathed in the blood of young Slovak women. Famke Janssen was originally cast in the title role.

In addition to being Jakubisko's first English-language film, Bathory was reported to be the most expensive motion picture production in the history of Czech or Slovak cinema, involving investment from numerous companies around Europe.

In 2007 it was reported that two former production staff members, Jan Milic and Karel Lupomesky, had stolen a copy of the film from studios in Prague and were threatening to release it on the Internet if they were not given £12,000. They were soon apprehended and the film was recovered, apparently without being released online. The pair were found guilty and received eight and ten month suspended sentences for attempted blackmail of producer Deana Jakubisková-Horváthová.

The world premiere of Bathory was held at the Karlovy Vary Film Festival, Czech Republic on 10 July 2008. The film was named the most successful film of all time in Slovakia.

Later activities
In May 2012 he received a heart transplant in Prague.

In 2013 Jakubisko published the first part of his autobiography, Živé stříbro.

Jakubisko was working on a fairy tale, a sequel of The Feather Fairy. The film was scheduled for a theatrical release in winter 2022.

Jakubisko died in Prague on 24 February 2023, at the age of 84.

Filmography
 Last attack ("Poslední nálet", 1960)
 Every day has a name ("Každý den má své jméno", 1960)
 Silver Wind ("Strieborný vietor", 1961)
 First Class ("První třída", 1962)
 Silence ("Mlčení", 1963)
 Rain ("Déšť", 1965)
 Waiting for Godot ("Čekají na Godota", 1965)
 Crucial Years ("Kristove roky", 1967); aka Christ's Years
 The Deserters and the Nomads ("Zbehovia a pútnici", 1968); aka Deserters and Pilgrims
 Birds, Orphans and Fools ("Vtáčkovia, siroty a blázni", 1969)
 The Construction of the Century ("Stavba storočia", 1972); documentary
 Slovakia - a country under the Tatras ("Slovensko - krajina pod Tatrami", 1975); TV documentary
 The Red Cross drummer ("Bubeník Červeného kríža", 1977); documentary
 Three bags of cement and a live rooster ("Tri vrecia cementu a živý kohút", 1978); documentary
 Painted on Wood ("Mal’ované na dreve", 1979); TV fantasy for children
 Build a House, Plant a Tree ("Postav dom, zasaď strom", 1980)
 Infidelity, Slovak Style ("Nevera po slovensky", 1981); two-part TV miniseries
 The Millennial Bee ("Tisícročná včela", 1983)
 The Feather Fairy ("Perinbaba", 1985)
 Freckled Max and the Spooks ("Pehatý Max a strašidlá", 1987)
 Frankenstein's Aunt ("Frankensteinova teta", 1987); TV miniseries
 Sitting on a Branch, Enjoying Myself ("Sedím na konári a je mi dobre", 1989)
 See You in Hell, Friends ("Dovidenia v pekle, priatelia", 1970, released 1990)
 Almost a Pink story ("Takmer ružový príbeh", 1990); for TV 2000 Wiesbaden, Germany
 It's Better to Be Wealthy and Healthy Than Poor and Ill (1992)
 An Ambiguous Report About the End of the World ("Nejasná zpráva o konci světa", 1997)
 Post Coitum (2004)
 Bathory (2008)

Awards
Jakubisko has been awarded at more than eighty international film festivals.

Awards for specific films

Other recognition

Theatre
 Casanova (1995) ballet, Laterna Magica, Prague, Czech Republic
 Krútňava (1999) opera, Slovak National Theatre, Bratislava, Slovakia
 Svätopluk (2008) opera, Slovak National Theatre, Bratislava, Slovakia

Exhibitions
 Paris (2000), France
 Berlin (2004),Germany, Italy (2004)
 Prague (2004, 2005), Czech Republic
 Miro Gallery, Bratislava (2009), Slovakia
 Presidential palace, Bratislava (2009), Slovakia
 6 exhibitions (2010), Czech Republic

References

External links
 

1938 births
2023 deaths
People from Gelnica District
Slovak film directors
Slovak experimental filmmakers
Academy of Performing Arts in Prague alumni
Slovak expatriates in the Czech Republic
Czechoslovak film directors
Merited Artists of Czechoslovakia
Recipients of Medal of Merit (Czech Republic)
Sun in a Net Awards winners
Heart transplant recipients